Hearnshaw is a surname. Notable people with the surname include:

Eric Hearnshaw (1893–1967), Australian politician
F. J. C. Hearnshaw (1869–1946), English historian
L. S. Hearnshaw (1907–1991), English psychologist and son of F. J. C.
John Hearnshaw (born 1946), New Zealand astronomer and son of L. S.
Sue Hearnshaw (born 1961), British athlete
Philip Hearnshaw (1952–2012), Australian filmmaker

See also
5207 Hearnshaw, asteroid

English-language surnames